Lapušnik or Llapushnik prison camp was a detention camp (also referred to as a prison) that was operated by the Kosovo Liberation Army, an Albanian militant organization, near the city of Glogovac in central Kosovo during the Kosovo War. It was operational in early 1998 and inmates were subject to intimidation, imprisonment, violence and murder. The victims were both Serbs and Albanians.

History
This takes place after the Battle of Llapushnik . According to the early indictments: In early 1998, KLA forces under the command of Fatmir Limaj and Isak Musliu detained Serb and Albanian civilians from the municipalities of Štimlje, Glogovac and Lipljan for prolonged periods in the camp. On 25 or 26 July, the KLA abandoned the camp when the Yugoslav army began its advance on Llapushnik.

Indictments
In 2003, the International Criminal Tribunal for the former Yugoslavia (ICTY) charged Fatmir Limaj, Isak Musliu and Haradin Bala.
In November 2005, all of the defendants except Haradin Bala were acquitted and released. Bala, who was a guard at the camp, was sentenced to 13 years in prison for persecution on political, racial and religious grounds and for cruel treatment, murders and for his role in maintenance and enforcement of inhumane conditions in the camp.

Although the exact number of inmates is unknown, 9 were executed in the mountains by Haradin Bala and two other guards.

See also
 2004 unrest in Kosovo

Notes

References

Sources
ICTY document: Limaj

Albanian war crimes in the Kosovo War
Kosovo Liberation Army
Anti-Serbian sentiment
Persecution of Serbs
Yugoslav Wars internment camps